Victorious is the last album released by The Perishers. It was released on 4 September 2007.

Track listing
All songs were written by Ola Klüft and The Perishers.

"Midnight Skies" – 4:35
"Never Bloom Again" – 2:19
"Carefree" – 3:14
"My Own" – 2:44
"Victorious" – 3:11
"Come Out of the Shade" – 3:59
"Best Friends" – 4:42
"Almost Pretty" – 4:26
"Is It Over Now?" – 2:36
"To Start a New" – 3:44
"8AM Departure" – 4:36
"Get Well Soon" – 3:15
"Sleep Tight"" – 2:32 U.S. iTunes only bonus track

References

2007 albums
2010 albums
The Perishers (band) albums